Aukštoji Gervė  is a river of Biržai district municipality, Panevėžys County, northern Lithuania. It flows for 26 kilometres and has a basin area of 109 km². It is a right tributary of the Apaščia.

References
 

Rivers of Lithuania
Biržai District Municipality